The 2014 Oceania Handball Champions Cup was held in Noumea from 18 to 21 June 2014. This was organised by the Oceania Handball Federation and featured teams from Australia and host's New Caledonia.

The tournament was won by Australian team Sydney University. They won the right to represent Oceania in the 2014 IHF Super Globe.

Results

Round Robin Stage

3rd-place play-off

Final

Final standings

References

 IHF Report. Retrieved 20 Oct 2014
 Results on St Kilda HC web page. Retrieved 20 Oct 2014
 3rd place match on YouTube
 Final match on YouTube
 Review on Planet Handball. 23 June 2014
 Report on Planet Handball. 25 March 2014

Oceania Handball Champions Cup
2014 in handball